Mal Khast (also Romanized as Māl Khāst; also known as Malkhas and Mālkhvāst) is a village in Poshtkuh Rural District, Chahardangeh District, Sari County, Mazandaran Province, Iran. At the 2006 census, its population was 332, in 81 families.

References 

Populated places in Sari County